Kevin O'Halloran (born 6 January 1994) is an Irish Gaelic football player who plays at inter-county level for Tipperary, and plays his club football for Portroe.

Career
O'Halloran made his championship debut for Tipperary in 2015 against Kerry. On 31 July 2016, he scored 0-4 as Tipperary defeated Galway in the 2016 All-Ireland Quarter-finals at Croke Park to reach their first All-Ireland semi-final since 1935.
On 21 August 2016, Tipperary were beaten in the semi-final by Mayo on a 2-13 to 0-14 scoreline.

Honours
Tipperary
Munster Under-21 Football Championship (1): 2015
 National Football League Division 3 (1): 2017

References

External links
Tipperary GAA Profile

1994 births
Living people
Tipperary inter-county Gaelic footballers